Henry Abeywickrema (27 December 1905 - 29 August 1976) was a Sri Lankan politician.

Henry Abeywickrema was born in 1905 in Baddegama and received his education at Richmond College and St. Aloysious' College in Galle.

Following the death of his older brother, Simon on 2 May 1948, Abeywickrema contested the July by-election for his brother's seat of Baddegama. He was however soundly beaten by over 6,500 votes by the United National Party candidate, H. W. Amarasuriya. In 1951 he joined the newly formed Sri Lanka Freedom Party.

He re-contested the Baddegama electorate at the 2nd parliamentary election in May 1952, successfully defeating the sitting member, H. W. Amarasuriya, by 7,752 votes. Abeywickrema retained his seat at the 1956 parliamentary elections, increasing his majority to 56%. Following which he was appointed the Parliamentary Secretary to the Minister of Transport and Works in the S. W. R. D. Bandaranaike cabinet and Minister for Works in the Dahanayake cabinet. He did not contest the 1960 parliamentary elections. In 1965, his civic rights were suspended for seven years following the enactment of the Imposition Of Civic Disabilities (Special Provisions) Act (No. 14 of 1965) based on the Thalagodapitiya Bribery Commission Report.

References 

1905 births
Members of the 2nd Parliament of Ceylon
Members of the 3rd Parliament of Ceylon
Parliamentary secretaries of Ceylon
Government ministers of Sri Lanka
Sri Lanka Freedom Party politicians
Sri Lankan politicians convicted of crimes
1976 deaths